PIPES is the common name for piperazine-N,N′-bis(2-ethanesulfonic acid), and is a frequently used buffering agent in biochemistry. It is an ethanesulfonic acid buffer developed by Good et al. in the 1960s.

Applications
PIPES has two pKa values. One pKa (6.76 at 25°C) is near the physiological pH which makes it useful in cell culture work. Its effective buffering range is 6.1-7.5 at 25° C. The second pKa value is at 2.67 with a buffer range of from 1.5-3.5.  PIPES has been documented minimizing lipid loss when buffering glutaraldehyde histology in plant and animal tissues. Fungal zoospore fixation for fluorescence microscopy and electron microscopy were optimized with a combination of glutaraldehyde and formaldehyde in PIPES buffer. It has a negligible capacity to bind divalent ions.

See also
MOPS
HEPES
MES
Tris
Common buffer compounds used in biology
Good's buffers

References

Buffer solutions
Sulfonic acids
Piperazines